China – United Arab Emirates relations refer to the diplomatic relations between the People's Republic of China and the United Arab Emirates. Diplomatic ties were first established in 1984. The UAE maintains an embassy in Beijing and a consulate-general in Hong Kong while China has an embassy in Abu Dhabi and consulate-general in Dubai. The UAE and China have been strong international allies, with significant cooperation across economic, political and cultural aspects.

Background
The relations between the two have historically been mounted on high-level trade. In 2007, China-UAE bilateral trade scaled new highs, exceeding $19.4 billion and indicating a growth rate of 41 percent. There are also some 2,000 Chinese firms operating in the UAE and a large community of Chinese in the United Arab Emirates who are involved primarily in the construction sector. Additionally, the UAE is China's second largest trading partner in the Persian Gulf region and the largest in terms of buying Chinese products.

According to Wen Jiabao, "the UAE is one of China's most important economic partners in the Persian Gulf region, serving as a transfer center for Chinese products to the Middle East and African markets." He also encouraged Emirati businesses to invest in China and Chinese companies to invest in the UAE, noting that the expansion of bilateral cooperation facilitates the fundamental interests of both nations.

During a visit to China in 2010, UAE Minister of Foreign Trade Sheikha Lubna Al Qasimi expressed that the UAE was keen on strengthening its strategic partnership with China and developing commercial and investment cooperation.

Ventures
In May 2010, both sides inked a memorandum of understanding with the aim of pushing forward cooperation in railway construction. Under the document, signed by Liu Zhijun and Sheikh Hamdan bin Mubarak Al Nahyan, the two sides will launch extensive cooperation in such areas as railway development, engineering construction, technical exchanges and personnel training.

Diplomatic visits
In July 2018, Chinese Communist Party general secretary Xi Jinping visited UAE. Xi meets Prime Minister Sheikh Mohammed bin Rashid Al Maktoum & Crown Prince of Abu Dhabi Sheikh Mohammed bin Zayed Al Nahyan in Abu Dhabi. Xi was awarded Order of Zayed by President Sheikh Khalifa bin Zayed Al Nahyan

Belt and Road initiative
China and the UAE signed $3.4 billion worth of deals as part of China's Belt and Road Initiative. The initiative aims to use the Port of Jebel Ali to ship Chinese products to the world using the UAE's position as both sea and land trading hub.

Immigration
There are over 180,000 people of Chinese origin living in the UAE.

Human rights
In July 2019, UN ambassadors of 37 countries, including UAE, Qatar, Bahrain and Saudi Arabia, signed a joint letter to the UNHRC defending China's treatment of Uyghurs in the Xinjiang region.

In June 2020, UAE was one of 53 countries that backed the Hong Kong national security law at the United Nations.

Bibliography

References

 
United Arab Emirates
Bilateral relations of the United Arab Emirates